Defending champion Steffi Graf successfully defended her title, defeating Martina Hingis in the final, 6–3, 4–6, 6–0, 4–6, 6–0 to win the singles tennis title at the 1996 WTA Tour Championships. It was her fifth and last Tour Finals singles title.

Seeds
A champion seed is indicated in bold text while text in italics indicates the round in which that seed was eliminated.

  Steffi Graf (champion)
  Monica Seles (first round)
  Arantxa Sánchez Vicario (quarterfinals)
  Conchita Martínez (quarterfinals)
  Jana Novotná (semifinals)
  Anke Huber (first round)
  Martina Hingis (final)
  Lindsay Davenport (quarterfinals)

Draw

 NB: The Final was the best of 5 sets while all other rounds were the best of 3 sets.

See also
WTA Tour Championships appearances

External links
 1996 Chase Championships Draw

Singles 1996
Singles